The 1961 Hofstra Flying Dutchmen football team was an American football team that represented Hofstra College during the 1961 NCAA College Division football season. Hofstra had one of the better records in the Middle Atlantic Conference, College–Northern Division, but was ineligible for the championship.

In their 12th year under head coach Howard "Howdy" Myers Jr., the Flying Dutchmen compiled a 7–2 record, and outscored opponents 168 to 41. Pete Carew, Dick Cooney and Tim Gannon were the team captains. 

Hofstra was one of three teams in the MAC Northern Division that finished the year undefeated in conference play. The other two, Susquehanna and Albright, finished in first and second place, but Hofstra was excluded from title contention. Conference rules required teams to play at least five games against opponents from the MAC's two "college" divisions, and Hofstra only played two. Three of its games were against MAC University Division members (Delaware, Gettysburg and Temple), but these did not count as conference games.

The Flying Dutchmen played their home games at Hofstra College Stadium in Hempstead on Long Island, New York.

Schedule

References

Hofstra
Hofstra Pride football seasons
Hofstra Flying Dutchmen football